Patrick Hessellund Egelund (born 2 August 2000) is a Danish footballer who plays for FC Fredericia.

Youth career
Egelund started playing football at the age of three alongside his older brother, Martin. They played together in a local club, Holsted fB, despite their age difference. Later, he joined Esbjerg fB, still alongside his brother, and Patrick signed his first contract on his 15th birthday. Patrick received a new contract in October 2017, which would keep him at the club until June 2020.

Career

Esbjerg fB
On 7 April 2019, Egelund got his official debut for Esbjerg, when he came on from the bench against FC Midtjylland with 10 minutes left. Egelund played two games in the Danish Superliga in the 2018/19 season, and was permanently promoted to the first team squad for the 2019/20 season. On 2 July 2019, Egelund signed a 4 year senior deal with the club.

He terminated his contract with Esbjerg on 4 August 2021.

Fredericia
On 13 August 2021, Egelund joined FC Fredericia on a deal until June 2023.

Personal life
Patrick is the younger brother of Martin Egelund, who also is a footballer. The two brothers also played together in Esbjerg on several youth teams and the reserve team. Both their parents also played football.

References

External links
Patrick Egelund at DBU

Danish men's footballers
2000 births
Living people
Esbjerg fB players
FC Fredericia players
Danish Superliga players
Danish 1st Division players
Association football forwards
People from Vejen Municipality
Sportspeople from the Region of Southern Denmark